This is a list of flying aces in World War II from Austria. For other countries see List of World War II aces by country

List

Notes and references

Austria
Austria in World War II